The Politics of Burkina Faso takes place in a framework of a semi-presidential republic, whereby the Prime Minister of Burkina Faso is the head of government, and of a multi-party system. The President of Burkina Faso is the head of state. Executive power is exercised by both the President and the Government. Legislative power is vested in both the government and parliament. The party system was dominated by the Congress for Democracy and Progress (CDP) until 2014. Burkina Faso’s CDP fell victim to a series of demonstrations and riots, to alter the constitution and extend the former president's term in office - referred to as the 2014 Burkinabé uprising. The military then declared itself to be in power and the state shifted to an electoral autocracy. Burkina Faso lacks the foundation that would support a democracy, with its current transition to a military regime, but not all hope is lost. After an internal coup ousted Paul-Henri Sandaogo Damiba,  the previous military head of state, a new transitional charter was adopted, naming Captain Ibrahim Traoré as president. Mr. Damiba's progressional failures on the state’s security front “swung a majority of domestic opinion in favour of the MPSR”. Mr. Traoré pledged a major reinforcement of armed forces to strengthen frontline units and recruited over 3,000 more troops. As the violence becomes so entrenched, it is nonetheless expected that  the security situation will remain dire in the medium term. “However, we expect that elections will still be held in 2024 as part of the army's plan to stabilise the security situation by boosting counter-terrorism operations.”

Important questions facing the state were the length of the MPSR rule, who would be president, and which institutions would run the country. Immediately after Mr. Damiba's ouster, the junta declared that it accepted a previous agreement to hold elections by July 2024, ending debate about the timeline. The MPSR initially suggested that the president might be "civilian or military", but widespread demonstrations expressed strong preferences for Mr. Traoré. This tilted the balance among contending military factions in his favor. Within the varieties of authoritarian regimes and transitions, we see how the rivalries between the officer corps and coups can be shaped by citizen preferences and with lots of time dedicated to internal consensus, democracy is one of the future.

Political history

In 1990, the Popular Front held its first National Congress, which formed a committee to draft a national constitution. The constitution was approved by referendum in 1991. In 1992, Blaise Compaoré was elected president, running unopposed after the opposition boycotted the election because of Compaoré's refusal to accede to demands of the opposition such as a Sovereign National Conference to set modalities. The opposition did participate in the following year's legislative elections, in which the ODP/MT won a majority of the seats contested for.

The government of the Fourth Republic includes a strong presidency, a prime minister, a Council of Ministers presided over by the president, a National Assembly, and the judiciary. The legislature and judiciary are independent but remain susceptible to outside influence.

In 1995, Burkina held its first multiparty municipal elections since it gained independence. The president's ODP/MT won over 1,100 of some 1,700 councilor seats being contested.

In February 1996, the ruling ODP/MT merged with several small opposition parties to form the Congress for Democracy and Progress (CDP). This effectively co-opted much of what little viable opposition to Compaoré existed. The remaining opposition parties regrouped in preparation for 1997 legislative elections and the 1998 presidential election. The 1997 legislative elections, which international observers pronounced to be substantially free, fair, and transparent, resulted in a large CDP majority—101 to 111 seats.

In January 2022 a coup d'état took place, the military announced on television that Kaboré had been deposed from his position as President. After the announcement, the military declared that the parliament, government and constitution had been dissolved. On 31 January, the military junta restored the constitution and appointed Paul-Henri Sandaogo Damiba as interim president. A few months later, On 30 September 2022, Paul was himself outsed by Ibrahim Traoré, his military colleague.  President Damiba resigned and left the country.  On 6 October 2022, Captain Ibrahim Traore was officially appointed as president of Burkina Faso.

Government

Executive branch

|President
|Ibrahim Traoré
|Military
|30 September 2022
|-
|Prime Minister
|Apollinaire Joachim Kyélem de Tambèla
|None
|21 October 2022
|}

The president is elected by popular vote for a five-year term and may serve up to two terms. The prime minister is appointed by the president with the consent of the legislature.  The constitution of 2 June 1991, established a semi-presidential government with a parliament which can be dissolved by the President of the Republic, who is elected for a term of 5 years. The year 2000 saw a constitutional amendment reducing the presidential term from 7 to 5 years, which was enforced during the 2005 elections. Another change according to the amendment would have prevented sitting president Blaise Compaoré from being re-elected. However, notwithstanding a challenge by other presidential candidates, in October 2005, the constitutional council ruled that because Compaoré was already a sitting president in 2000, the amendment would not apply to him until the end of his second term in office, thereby clearing the way for his candidacy in the 2005 election. On 13 November Compaoré was reelected in a landslide due to a divided political opposition. In 2010, Compaoré was once again re-elected, and the term limit requirement was held to not apply to him. A proposed constitutional amendment in 2014 would have permitted him to run again, but public resistance led to the 2014 Burkinabé uprising, and Compaoré resigned on 31 October 2014. A transitional government headed by President Michel Kafondo and Prime Minister Isaac Zida took power for a one-year mandate. Elections were to have been held in October 2015, but members of the Regiment of Presidential Security launched a coup on 16 September 2015, detaining President Kafando and Prime Minister Zida. RSP commander Gilbert Diendéré named himself the head of the new military junta, but popular resistance, backed by army and gendarmerie forces not aligned with the RSP, forced his resignation and the restoration of the transitional government a week later.

Legislative branch
According to the constitution, the Parliament votes on the law, consents to taxation, and controls the actions of the government under provisions of the constitution. The Parliament, which is made up of the National Assembly and Senate, meets each year in two ordinary sessions, each of which may not exceed ninety days. The first session opens on the first Wednesday of March and the second the last Wednesday of September. If either of these days lands on a holiday, the session opens the next first working day. Each chamber of Parliament meets in extraordinary session on request of the President, demand of the Prime Minister, or of an absolute majority of half of the Deputies or Senators on a specific agenda and closes at the completion of said agenda.

The National Assembly (Assemblée Nationale) has 111 members, named Deputies, and are elected for a five-year term by proportional representation.

The Senate, as described in the Constitution of Burkina Faso, would consist of representatives from local government divisions, customary and religious authorities, workers, employers, Burkinabes abroad and people appointed by the President of Burkina Faso and serve a term of six years. The constitution requires that anyone elected or appointed must be 45 years old by the day of the ballot.

In May 2013, then-President Compaoré announced the establishment of a new Senate with 89 members, 29 of which would be selected by the president themselves, and the rest appointed by local officials. With Senate elections being held in July 2013, government opposition groups warned against a legislative body with a majority of handpicked sympathizers by the president. Compaoré was successful in appointing 1/3rd of the Senate, prompting protesters rallying in the streets of Bobo-Dioulasso and the capital Ouagadougou to protest the establishment of the Senate, which has since been postponed.

The Presidents of both the Senate and National Assembly are elected for the duration of the legislator by an absolute majority of half the chamber in the first round of voting, or a simple majority in the second round. Their functions can be terminated during the course of a legislature at the demand of two-fifths and a vote of the absolute majority of the members of the Assembly. In the case of vacancy of the presidency of either chamber of Parliament by death, resignation, or other reason, said chamber elects a new president by the same method. Each chamber has financial autonomy, with the President of the said chamber managing the credits allocated to them for the functioning of the chamber, but with a vote of the absolute majority, the chamber can dismiss the President for incompetence in managing finances.

Unless discovered in flagrante delicto, any member of Parliament can only be prosecuted or arrested in a penal or criminal matter with the authorization of at least one-third members of the chamber which they reside.

Political parties and elections

 2020 Burkinabé general election

Political pressure groups
Burkinabé General Confederation of Labor (CGTB); Burkinabé Movement for Human Rights (HBDHP); Group of 14 February; National Confederation of Burkinabé Workers (CNTB); National Organization of Free Unions (ONSL); watchdog/political action groups throughout the country in both organizations and communities

Administrative divisions
Burkina Faso is divided into 13 regions and 45 provinces:

Regions:
 Boucle du Mouhoun, Cascades, Centre, Centre-Est, Centre-Nord, Centre-Ouest, Centre-Sud, Est, Hauts-Bassins, Nord, Plateau-Central, Sahel, Sud-Ouest

Provinces: 
Balé, Bam, Banwa, Bazega, Bougouriba, Boulgou, Boulkiemde, Comoé, Ganzourgou, Gnagna, Gourma, Houet, Ioba, Kadiogo, Kenedougou, Komondjari, Kompienga, Kossi, Koulpelogo, Kouritenga, Kourweogo, Leraba, Loroum, Mouhoun, Namentenga, Nahouri, Nayala, Noumbiel, Oubritenga, Oudalan, Passore, Poni, Sanguie, Sanmatenga, Séno, Sissili, Soum, Sourou, Tapoa, Tuy, Yagha, Yatenga, Ziro, Zondoma, Zoundweogo

International organization participation
ACCT, ACP, AfDB, AU, ECA, ECOWAS, Entente, FAO, G-77, IAEA, IBRD, ICAO, ICC, ITUC, ICRM, IDA, IDB, IFAD, IFC, IFRCS, ILO, IMF, Intelsat, Interpol, IOC, ITU, NAM, OAU, OIC, OPCW, PCA, UN, UNCTAD, UNESCO, UNIDO, UPU, WADB, WADB (regional), WAEMU, WCO, WFTU, WHO, WIPO, WMO, WTOO, WTrO.

International relationships
The ambassador of Burkina Faso to Canada is Juliette Bonkoungou.

The ambassador of Burkina Faso to Mexico is Jonathan Hodgson.

The former ambassador of Burkina Faso to the United States was Tertius Zongo, he left his post when appointed Prime Minister in July 2007; the US Ambassador to Burkina Faso is Andrew Robert Young.

See also
 2019 Burkina Faso government resignation

Notes

References